VDP may refer to:

In technology:
 Variable data printing, type of on-demand printing in which text and graphics may be altered in-process 
 Variable data publishing, may to any variable data output, often to distinguish from "variable data printing" for electronic viewing output
 Vector Distance Panning, technique for panning sounds around a 3D array of speakers
 Video Disk Player, fore-runner of DVD player, now an obsolete format
 Video Display Processor, term used by Sega and other manufacturers for the Video Display Controller in some of its video game consoles

Wine and viniculture:
 Verband Deutscher Prädikatsweingüter, or the Association of German Prädikat Wine Estates
 Vin de pays, French wine classification

Other:
 Van Dyke Parks, American composer and arranger
 Vesicle Docking Protein
 Visual descent point in aviation
 Village Defence Party, a paramilitary in Bangladesh.
 Volunteers for the Defense of the Homeland, VDP, in Burkina Faso.
 Vanden Plas, a coachbuilder and later, automotive marque and model designation, originally spelled Van den Plas and abbreviated "VdP".